Linoy Ashram (born ) is a retired Israeli individual rhythmic gymnast. She is the 2020 Olympic All-around Champion, the 2018 World All-around silver medalist, two-time (2017, 2019) World All-around bronze medalist, the 2020 European All-around champion, and the 2019 European Games All-around silver medalist. She is the third Israeli athlete and first Israeli woman to win an Olympic gold medal in any sport, and the first Israeli rhythmic gymnast to win an Olympic medal.
She became the first rhythmic gymnast from outside a post-Soviet republic to win a gold medal at an Olympics where former Soviet states participated. Ashram announced her retirement from competitive gymnastics at a press conference in Tel Aviv on 4 April 2022.

Early life
Ashram was born in Rishon LeZion, Israel, to Israeli-born parents of both Mizrahi Jewish (Yemeni Jewish) and Sephardi Jewish (Greek Jewish) descent. Her father Oren is a standing army soldier in the IDF, whereas her mother Hedva is a kindergarten teacher assistant. She has an older sister, Chen, an older brother, Idan, and a younger sister, Hila.

In November 2017, at the age of 18, Ashram enrolled in the Israel Defense Forces as a soldier, where she worked as an administrative assistant. She had an honorable discharge in December 2019 after serving her mandatory enlistment.

As of 2018, Ashram resides in her Israeli hometown of Rishon LeZion, Israel.

In 2019,she started studying education and society at the Ono Academic College in Kiryat Ono, Israel. She completed her studies in 2022. She works as a member of the training staff for the Israeli national rhythmic gymnastics team as of mid-2022.

Sports career
Her head coach and choreographer is Israeli former national champion Ayelet Zussman.

Junior
Ashram appeared in international competitions in 2011. In 2014, Ashram started her season competing in the 2014 Miss Valentine Cup in Tartu, Estonia, then in the junior division at the 2014 Moscow Grand Prix where she finished 9th in the all-around; following her placement she earned a qualification for Israel to compete for the Youth Olympic Games. Ashram competed in the World Cup series Pesaro, and in Tashkent where she won silver medal in clubs and hoop. In her next event at the Minsk World Cup, she took silver for Team Israel and finished 4th in the all-event finals.

On 10–16 June 2014, Ashram competed at the 2014 European Junior Championships and qualified to all four event finals, taking the bronze medal in clubs and ribbon, placing 4th in ball, and 5th in hoop. Ashram then competed at the World Cup in Sofia, where she finished 4th in all-around. Ashram went on to represent Israel at the 2014 Youth Olympic Games in Nanjing, China, where she finished 5th in all-around finals behind Romania's Ana Luiza Filiorianu. She was the flag bearer of the closing ceremony in the Youth Olympic Games. In November, Ashram won the all-around gold at the 2014 JGP Final in Innsbruck, Austria, ahead of Moldova's Nicoleta Dulgheru.

Senior

2015 
In the 2015 season, Ashram debuted as a senior competing in the international tournament at the 2015 Moscow Grand Prix, finishing 4th in the all-around. On 15–16 May, Ashram competed at the 2015 Holon Grand Prix, finishing 11th in all-around. In August, Ashram competed at the MTK Budapest Cup, finishing 5th in the all-around and qualifying to three apparatus finals. She won the all-around bronze at the Yoldyz Cup International in Kazan, Russia. On 9–13 September, Ashram (together with teammates Neta Rivkin and Victoria Veinberg Filanovsky) competed at the 2015 World Championships in Stuttgart, with Team Israel finishing 4th. On 16–18 October, Ashram competed at the 2015 Grand Prix Final in Brno, where she won the all-around silver medal with a total of 70.000 points. She qualified to all apparatus finals, taking silver in hoop, ball, and in the last two apparatus, due to Margarita Mamun's withdrawal in the last two events, Ashram won gold in clubs and another silver in ribbon behind Uzbekistani Anastasiya Serdyukova. Ashram became the second-youngest Grand Prix Final medalist since Yanina Batyrchina. In November, Ashram won the all-around gold at the 2015 Happy Cup in Asker, Norway, ahead of Moldova's Nicoleta Dulgheru.

2016 
Ashram began her season competing at the 2016 Grand Prix Moscow, finishing 16th in the all-around and qualifying for the hoop, ball, and ribbon finals. On 12–13 March, Ashram competed at the MTM Tournament in Ljubljana, Slovenia, where she won the all-around bronze with a total of 71.350 points, in the apparatus finals; she won bronze in hoop, ribbon placed 4th in ball and 7th in clubs. At the 30th Thiais Grand Prix event in Paris, Ashram finished 8th in the all-around with a total of 71.100 points; she qualified for three apparatus finals. On 1–3 April, Ashram then competed at the 2016 Pesaro World Cup, where she finished 9th in the all-around and qualified for the ribbon final, placing 8th. She won the all-around silver medal at the 2016 Israeli Championships behind Victoria Veinberg Filanovsky. On 13–15 May, Ashram competed at the 2016 Tashkent World Cup, where she won bronze in the all-around (71.800) edging out teammate Neta Rivkin, Ashram qualified for all four apparatus finals: winning bronze in ball (tied with Anastasiya Serdyukova), 4th in hoop and clubs, and 6th in ribbon. On 27–29 May, Ashram finished 7th in the all-around at the 2016 Sofia World Cup, with a total of 70.800 points; she qualified in hoop, ball and ribbon finals. On 17–19 June, Ashram competed at the 2016 European Championships where she finished in 8th place with a total of 72.074 points. On 23–24 September, Ashram culminated her season with her competition at the 2016 Grand Prix Final in Eilat, where she finished 4th in the all-around with a total of 72.850 points behind Russian Arina Averina. She qualified for all the apparatus finals; winning a bronze in clubs, placed 4th in hoop and ball, and 5th in ribbon.

2017 
Ashram competed at the 2017 Grand Prix Moscow, finishing 6th in the all-around and qualifying for all the apparatus finals; she won bronze in clubs, placed 4th in ball, and 5th in hoop and ribbon. She then competed at the 2017 Tashkent World Cup, finishing 8th in the all-around and qualified for three apparatus finals, taking bronze in hoop, and finishing 6th in ball and 5th in clubs. On 5–7 May, Ashram competed at the 2017 Sofia World Cup, and took bronze in the all-around with a total of 70.300 points; she qualified for all the apparatus finals and won silver in hoop, bronze in clubs, and placed 4th in ribbon and 8th in ball. On 19–21 May, Ashram together with teammate Victoria Veinberg Filanovsky represented the individual senior for Israel at the 2017 European Championships; she qualified for all the apparatus finals and won bronze medals in clubs, and finished 5th in ball and 6th in ribbon. At the 2017 Maccabiah Games, she won all five gold medals (the all-around, ball, ribbon, hoop, and clubs). Ashram competed at the quadrennial-held 2017 World Games in Wrocław, Poland, from 20–30 July; she qualified for all the apparatus finals, winning a silver medal in clubs ahead of Arina Averina, a bronze in hoop behind Russian Dina Averina, and finished 8th in ball and 6th in ribbon. On 11–13 August, Ashram competed at the 2017 Kazan World Challenge Cup, and finished 4th in the all-around behind Katsiaryna Halkina; she qualified in all the apparatus finals and won four bronze medals, in hoop, ball, clubs and ribbon. From 30 August to 3 September, at the 2017 World Championships in Pesaro, Italy, she qualified in three apparatus finals, finishing 6th in hoop, 4th in ball, and winning bronze in ribbon. In the all-around, Ashram made history by becoming the first Israeli rhythmic gymnast to podium in the all-around by winning bronze at the Worlds; previously Neta Rivkin was the only Israeli to win a medal, but it was in an apparatus final (a bronze medal in hoop).

2018 
Ashram's season began on 30 March – 1 April with a competition at the 2018 Sofia World Cup finishing with a bronze medal in the all-around, in the event finals, she won her first World Cup gold with ribbon, and finishing 4th in ball, clubs and 8th with hoop. On 13–15 April, Ashram won the bronze medal in the all-around at the 2018 Pesaro World Cup, she qualified to all apparatus finals; she won the gold with clubs, silver with ball, placed 5th in hoop and ribbon. On 20–22 April, at the 2018 Tashkent World Cup, Ashram won silver in the all-around (73.100 points) behind Aleksandra Soldatova, she qualified in all event finals taking silver in hoop, ball, ribbon and a bronze in clubs. She was the overall 2018 World Cup Series all-around winner based on her results in Sofia, Pesaro, and Tashkent. On 4–6 May, Ashram won her first gold medal in all-around (72.800 points) at the 2018 Guadalajara World Cup edging out Russians Aleksandra Soldatova and Arina Averina, in the apparatus finals: she took gold in ball, earned silver with hoop and ribbon and finished 6th in clubs.

2019 

She competed at the Sofia World Cup, winning silver in the all around behind Alexandra Soldatova and in the apparatus finals she won gold in hoop and clubs, and bronze in ball and ribbon. At the World Cup in Baku, she placed 6th behind Katrin Taseva in the all-around and only made it to 2 apparatus finals, where she took silver in hoop and gold in ball. In maces I occupy the tenth place and in tape the twenty-second. Ashram did not participate in the European Rhythmic Gymnastics Championships, in Baku, Azerbaijan, due to injury. She was replaced by her partner Yuliana Telegina. At the World Challenge Cup Minsk she won bronze in the all around behind Arina Averina, and in the apparatus finals she won gold in hoop, bronze in ball, silver in clubs and fourth place in ribbon. from Cluj-Napoca, won the all-around gold ahead of Ekaterina Selezneva and Nicol Zeliman, in the apparatus finals she won gold in hoop, ribbon, silver in clubs and fourth place in ball.

In June 2019, Ashram competed at the European Games, in Minsk, Belarus, winning gold in ball and clubs, and silver in ribbon and all-around.
She finally competed at the 2019 World Championships Rhythmic Gymnastics, in Baku,Azerbaiyán, her most successful. She helped the Israeli team to win its first silver team medal (Nicol Zelikman, Yuliana Telegina, Nicol Voronkov) she won a bronze with ball and in the All-Around (despite a drop with hoop) and silver with hoop, clubs and ribbon.

2020 
Ashram won a gold medal at the Gymnastic European championships in Kyiv on 29 September. She narrowly beat Alina Harnasko, her Belarusian competitor in the all-around competition with a total score of 100.9.

This last success placed Ashram as one of the main Israeli hopes for the 2020 Tokyo Olympics, which were postponed to 2021 due to the COVID-19 pandemic.

2021

In March 2021 she won two gold medals and one bronze medal in the Rhythmic Gymnastics World Cup in Sofia, Bulgaria. She also won 5 gold medal in the all-around individual, hoop, clubs, ribbon and ball on the Grand Prix Tel Aviv.

2020 Tokyo Summer Olympics 
On 7 August 2021, Ashram competed for Israel at the 2020 Summer Olympics. She won the gold medal in the rhythmic individual all-around competition.

She qualified to the finals in 3rd place after receiving a combined score of 103.100 on all four apparatus. In the finals, she finished in first place after scoring 107.800 (27.550 on hoop, 28.300 on ball, 28.650 on clubs and 23.300 on ribbon), ahead of the qualifying-round favorite, ROC's (Russian Olympic Committee's) gymnast Dina Averina, by 0.150 points. Despite a 0.700 penalty for dropping the ribbon, Ashram led by a wide margin in both the clubs and hoop exercises, giving her the total higher score.

Some Russian newscasters, politicians and athletes had a hard time accepting Ashram's victory over Averina, claiming that the Israeli win was due to "unfair refereeing" towards the Russian gymnasts (similar claims were made regarding the group all-around contest in the 2020 Tokyo Olympics, where Bulgaria's team won gold while ROC's team finished second). Their claims were dismissed by the international governing body, the FIG (International Gymnastics Federation). 4

2022
On 4 April, Ashram announced her retirement at a press conference.

Gymnastics technique
Her signature skill is the back-bend turn on floor with help – also known as the "Ashram".

Awards and recognition
 First Israeli rhythmic gymnast to win an individual all-around medal (bronze) at the 2017 World Championships.
 First Israeli to win gold in the all-around in the World Cup series which she won at the 2018 Guadalajara World Cup.
 First Israeli rhythmic gymnast to win gold at the Grand Prix Final.
 First Israeli to win gold in a World Cup series apparatus final.
 First Israeli rhythmic gymnast to win a European All-Around title, which she won at the 2020 European Championships.
 Second-youngest rhythmic gymnast to medal at the Grand Prix Final, after Yanina Batyrchina of the Russian Federation.
 First gymnast to win two consecutive All-Around titles in a World Challenge Cup circuit (Guadalajara and Minsk) in 2018.
 First Israeli rhythmic gymnast, the first rhythmic gymnast from outside a post-Soviet republic to win a gold medal at an Olympics where former Soviet states participated and the first non-Russian rhythmic gymnast since 1996, to become Olympic gold medalist in the individual all-around.
 First Israeli female Olympian to win a gold medal. Third Israeli Olympian to become a gold medalist.

Musical scores

Detailed Olympic results

Competitive highlights 
(Team competitions in seniors are held only at the World Championships, Europeans and other Continental Games.)

See also
 List of Jews in sports
 Sports in Israel
 Nicol Zelikman

References

External links

 
 
 
 
 
 
 
 Linoy Ashram at 2014 Summer Youth Olympics (archived)
 

1999 births
Living people
Israeli rhythmic gymnasts
Medalists at the Rhythmic Gymnastics World Championships
Jewish gymnasts
Israeli Sephardi Jews
Israeli Mizrahi Jews
Gymnasts at the 2014 Summer Youth Olympics
Maccabiah Games gold medalists for Israel
Competitors at the 2017 Maccabiah Games
Maccabiah Games medalists in gymnastics
Gymnasts at the 2019 European Games
European Games medalists in gymnastics
European Games gold medalists for Israel
European Games silver medalists for Israel
Israeli people of Yemeni-Jewish descent
Israeli people of Greek-Jewish descent
World Games silver medalists
World Games bronze medalists
Competitors at the 2017 World Games
Medalists at the Rhythmic Gymnastics European Championships
Olympic gymnasts of Israel
Gymnasts at the 2020 Summer Olympics
Olympic gold medalists for Israel
Ono Academic College alumni
Jewish sportswomen
Sportspeople from Rishon LeZion
Medalists at the 2020 Summer Olympics
Olympic medalists in gymnastics